Mount Sletten is a conspicuous rock peak surmounting Taylor Ridge on the west side of Scott Glacier, 4 nautical miles (7 km) northeast of Mount Pulitzer. Discovered and roughly mapped by the Byrd Antarctic Expedition, 1928–30. Named by Advisory Committee on Antarctic Names (US-ACAN) for Robert S. Sletten who made studies in satellite geodesy at McMurdo Station in 1965.

Mountains of the Ross Dependency
Amundsen Coast